The Planter's Exchange, Inc. is a historic site in Havana, Florida. It is located at 204 2nd Street, Northwest, and was originally a tobacco warehouse. On September 17, 1999, it was added to the U.S. National Register of Historic Places.

References

External links

 Gadsden County listings at National Register of Historic Places
 The Planters Exchange
 Florida's Office of Cultural and Historical Programs
 Gadsden County listings
 Planter's Exchange, Inc.

Agricultural buildings and structures on the National Register of Historic Places in Florida
Tobacco in the United States
Tobacco buildings in the United States
National Register of Historic Places in Gadsden County, Florida
Buildings and structures in Gadsden County, Florida